J.L. Ilsley High School is a Canadian high school located in Spryfield in the eastern part of Halifax, Nova Scotia. The school is named after James Lorimer Ilsley, a former federal cabinet minister who served in Prime Minister William Lyon Mackenzie King's World War II government and was later Chief Justice of the Supreme Court of Nova Scotia.  The school opened in 1971. Funding for the construction of a new school to replace the existing structure was announced in 2018. The province of Nova Scotia has opened the new school for the 2021–2022 school year.

Notable alumni 
 Jackie Barrett, Special Olympics Powerlifter, amassed 15 Powerlifting medals at four Special Olympics World Games appearances
 Joey Comeau – writer, creator of A Softer World
 Matt Robinson – poet 
 Peter North – pornographic performer and producer

References

External links 
 J. L. Ilsley High School 
 School profile at Halifax Regional School Board

High schools in Halifax, Nova Scotia
Schools in Halifax, Nova Scotia
Educational institutions established in 1971